30 may refer to:

30 (number), the natural number following 29 and preceding 31
one of the years 30 BC, AD 30, 1930, 2030

Music
30 (Laurent Garnier album), 1997, by Laurent Garnier
30 (Harry Connick Jr. album), 2001
30 (James Yorkston album), 2004, by James Yorkston
30 (Jerusalem album), 2006, also called Tretti
30 (Trio da Paz album), 2016
"30", an compilation album by German duo Modern Talking, 2014
30 (Adele album), 2021
"Thirty", a song by Karma to Burn from the album Wild, Wonderful Purgatory, 1999
"30", a 2021 song by Bo Burnham from the special Bo Burnham: Inside
"30", a 2021 song by Pop Smoke from the album Faith

Other uses
"-30-", traditionally used by journalists in North America to indicate the end of a story
-30- (film), 1959, also released as Deadline Midnight
30 (Law & Order: Criminal Intent), an episode of the television series Law & Order: Criminal Intent
–30– (The Wire), the series finale of the HBO original series The Wire
30 (tennis), a score indicating two points won
30 caliber

See also
The Thirty (disambiguation)
Renault 30, a French car produced between 1975 and 1984
 List of highways numbered 30